This is about the children TV series, not the Image Comics miniseries.

Les Intrépides (French for The Intrepids) is a France-Quebec TV series for children, released between 1993 and 1996, that ran for 52 episodes (about 30 minutes each).

The series is about adventures of two kids; Julie Boileau and Tom Miller, whose parents got married and that made them step-siblings. Tom and Julie run their own radio station for kids and help its listeners to resolve their - often criminal - adventures and problems.

Cast
Jessica Barker as Julie Boileau 
Lorànt Deutsch as Tom Miller 
Danielle Proulx as Claire Boileau (Julie's mother) 
Luc Gentil as Robert Miller (Tom's father) 
Tchee as Trahn 
Vincent Bolduc as Antoine

Crew
Writers: Eric Rognard, Eric Summer
Directors: Gilberto Azevedo, Bernard Dubois, Olivier Langlois, Laurent Lévy, Jacques Payette, Johanne Prégent

External links

The TvTome entry

Canadian children's animated adventure television series
1990s Canadian animated television series
Television series by Cookie Jar Entertainment
Television series by DHX Media